Douglas A. Thomas is an American politician and businessperson. Thomas is a Republican State Senator from Maine's 27th District, representing parts of Piscataquis, Somerset, and Penobscot counties, including the population centers of Dover-Foxcroft and Millinocket.

He represented the towns of Athens, Harmony, Ripley, Dexter, Garland and Charleston in the Maine House of Representatives.

Electoral history
Thomas was first elected to the Maine State Senate in 2010, when he replaced fellow Republican Douglas Smith, who chose not to run for re-election. In November 2012, Thomas defeated Democratic Representative Herbert E. Clark of Millinocket and won re-election to a second term. In June 2014, Thomas lost a contested primary to former State Senator Paul Davis. The primary for the Republican nomination received statewide attention because of negative campaigning by both campaigns. Thomas received 42.29% of the vote.

References

Year of birth missing (living people)
Living people
Republican Party Maine state senators
Republican Party members of the Maine House of Representatives
People from Somerset County, Maine
Businesspeople from Maine